Armored Trooper VOTOMS: The Roleplaying Game is a role-playing game published by R. Talsorian Games in 1997.

Description
Armored Trooper VOTOMS: The Roleplaying Game is a science fiction game based on the Armored Trooper Votoms anime, and uses the Fuzion system.

Publication history
Armored Trooper VOTOMS: The Roleplaying Game was published by R. Talsorian Games in 1997.

References

Mecha role-playing games
R. Talsorian Games games
Role-playing games based on anime and manga
Role-playing games introduced in 1997